Charles Fitzsimmons may refer to:
 Charles Fitzsimmons (politician) (1802–1876), member of the Queensland Legislative Assembly
 Charles B. Fitzsimons (1924–2001), actor and movie producer